The ten city-kingdoms of ancient Cyprus were the Greek, Graeco-Phoenician or Graeco-Eteocypriot, states listed in an inscription of the Assyrian king Esarhaddon in 673-672 BC:
Paphos, Πάφος (Greek)
Salamis, Σαλαμίς (Greek)
Soloi, Σόλοι (Greek)
Kourion, Κούριον (Greek)
Chytroi, Χῦτροι (Greek)
Kition, Κίτιον (Graeco-Phoenician)
Amathus, Ἀμαθούς (Graeco-Eteocypriot)
Idalion, Ἰδάλιον (Greek)
Ledrai, Λῆδραι (Greek)
Tamassos, Ταμασσός (Greek)
And later :
Kyrenia, Κυρηνεία (Greek)
Lapethos, Λάπηθος (Greek, Graeco-Phoenician for a short while)
Marion, Μάριον (Greek)

References

Cities in ancient Cyprus
Kingdoms in Greek Antiquity